Muhammad Naeem  Safdar Ansari is a Pakistani politician who was a Member of the Provincial Assembly of the Punjab, from 2008 to May 2018 and from August 2018 to January 2023.

Early life and education
He was born on 26 January 1982 in Lahore.

He graduated from University of the Punjab and has the degree of Bachelor of Arts.

Political career
He was elected to the Provincial Assembly of the Punjab as a candidate of Pakistan Muslim League (N) (PML-N) from Constituency PP-177 (Kasur-III) in 2008 Pakistani general election. He received 30,677 votes and defeated a candidate of Pakistan Peoples Party.

He was re-elected to the Provincial Assembly of the Punjab as a candidate of PML-N from Constituency PP-177 (Kasur-III) in 2013 Pakistani general election.

He was re-elected to Provincial Assembly of the Punjab as a candidate of PML-N from Constituency PP-174 (Kasur-I) in 2018 Pakistani general election.

References

Living people
Punjab MPAs 2013–2018
Punjab MPAs 2008–2013
1982 births
Pakistan Muslim League (N) MPAs (Punjab)
Punjab MPAs 2018–2023